Shahzad Qureshi is a Pakistani politician who is member-elect of the Provincial Assembly of Sindh.

Political career
He was elected to the Provincial Assembly of Sindh from Constituency PS-111 (Karachi South-V) as a candidate of Pakistan Tehreek-e-Insaf in by-election held on 21 October 2018.

References

Living people
Pakistan Tehreek-e-Insaf MPAs (Sindh)
Sindh MPAs 2018–2023
Year of birth missing (living people)